Angel Acoustic EP is a five-track acoustic EP released by the Canadian rock band Theory of a Deadman on April 28, 2015.

Production 

While out on tour supporting their 2014 album Savages, the band began recording the EP in the last quarter of 2014 up till the first quarter of 2015.

The EP contains four previously released songs — "Angel" from Savages (2014), "Santa Monica" from Gasoline (2005), "Not Meant to Be" from Scars & Souvenirs (2008) and "The One" from Savages — and one newly recorded song titled "Habits (Stay High)" which is a cover of a Tove Lo song.

Track listing

Personnel 
 Tyler Connolly
 Dean Back
 Dave Brenner
 Joey Dandeneau

References 

2015 debut EPs
Theory of a Deadman albums